The Terror is a 1917 American silent crime drama film directed by Raymond Wells and starring Jack Mulhall, Grace MacLaren and Virginia Lee.

Cast
 Jack Mulhall as Chuck Connelly
 Grace MacLaren as Maggie Connelly
 Virginia Lee as Annie Mangan
 Malcolm Blevins as Jim Canford
 Hugh Hoffman as Jerome Travers
 Noble Johnson as Mike Tregurtha
 Jean Hersholt as Jimm, the Dope
 Evelyn Selbie as Mrs. Connelly

References

Bibliography
 Robert B. Connelly. The Silents: Silent Feature Films, 1910-36, Volume 40, Issue 2. December Press, 1998.

External links
 

1917 films
1917 drama films
1910s English-language films
American silent feature films
Silent American drama films
American black-and-white films
Universal Pictures films
Films directed by Raymond Wells
1910s American films